The northern slaty antshrike (Thamnophilus punctatus) is a species of bird in the family Thamnophilidae. It previously included the Natterer's slaty antshrike, Bolivian slaty antshrike, Planalto slaty antshrike and Sooretama slaty antshrike as subspecies, in which case the combined species simply was referred to as the slaty antshrike.

The northern slaty antshrike is found in north-eastern South America in Brazil, Venezuela and the Guianas. In Brazil, it occurs in the northeast quadrant of the Amazon Basin, (with the Guianas), and from the Brazilian state of Roraima in the west, to the states of Pará, and Amapá on the Atlantic at the Amazon River outlet. The species occurs only north of the Amazon. A disjunct population exists along the eastern slope of the Andes in Colombia and Venezuela, while two other populations exist in the drainage of the Huallaga and the Marañón River in northern Peru and far southern Ecuador. The populations in Peru and Ecuador are sometimes considered a separate species, the Marañón or Peruvian slaty antshrike (Thamnophilus leucogaster), in which case the common name of the remaining species often is modified to eastern or Guianan slaty antshrike.

It occurs at low levels in forest (generally avoids interior of dense humid forest) and woodland.

References

External links
Photo-Medium Res; Article ib.usp.br—"Thamnophilidae"

northern slaty antshrike
Birds of the Brazilian Amazon
Birds of the Peruvian Amazon
Birds of Colombia
Birds of Venezuela
Birds of the Guianas
northern slaty antshrike
Taxonomy articles created by Polbot